Paragordius is a genus of worms belonging to the family Chordodidae. It was independently described by both Lorenzo Camerano in 1897 and Thomas Harrison Montgomery Jr. in 1898, though both authors gave the genus the same name.

The genus has almost cosmopolitan distribution, although most species are known from the Afrotropic and Neotropic regions. Females of the genus are notable for having three posterior lobes, while males have long tail lobes, allowing Paragordius species to be readily identified.

Species:

Paragordius amicus 
Paragordius andreasii 
Paragordius areolatus 
Paragordius cinctus 
Paragordius dartevallei 
Paragordius diversolobatus 
Paragordius emeryi 
Paragordius esavianus 
Paragordius flavescens 
Paragordius laurae 
Paragordius marlieri 
Paragordius minusculus 
Paragordius mulungensis 
Paragordius obamai 
Paragordius somaliensis 
Paragordius stylosus 
Paragordius tanganikensis 
Paragordius tricuspidatus 
Paragordius varius

References

Nematomorpha